Reinbek is a station on the Berlin-Hamburg railway line and served by the trains of Hamburg S-Bahn line S21. The station was originally opened in 1846 and is located in the town of Reinbek, near Hamburg, Germany.

History 
The station was originally opened on 15 December 1846 on the steam railway line to Berlin. Before 29 September 1968, steam trains served the station, which were originally called the S6 line of the HVV network. They were replaced by diesel locomotives for a few months, but already on 1 June 1969 the electrical S-Bahn was extended to Aumühle station.

From 24 May 1994 to 1 June 1997 S-Bahn operation rested behind Bergedorf - the separation of S-Bahn and railway tracks had been completed. For the following five years Reinbek was the terminus of the trains of the S21. On 26 May 2002 the S-Bahn to Aumühle was reopened. Before renovation track 1 (to Hamburg city) was located between two platforms, the northernmost of which was blocked by a fence for several years. Reinbek station was fully renovated afterwards at cost of around €6 million and re-opened on 29 March 2007. 2 lifts are in operation since then.

Station layout
Reinbek is an at-level station with an island platform and 2 tracks. There is no service personnel attending the station, but an SOS and information telephone is available. There are some places to lock a bicycle and parking spots at a Park and Ride facility. The station is fully accessible for handicapped persons, as there are 2 lifts. Several shops are located at the station, as well as a taxi stand and a public toilet. There are no lockerboxes.

Service
The line S21 of Hamburg S-Bahn serves Reinbek station. The bus lines 136, 235, 236, 237, 436, and 736 as well as the night bus line 649 have a stop here.

See also  

 Hamburger Verkehrsverbund (HVV)
 List of Hamburg S-Bahn stations

References

External links 

 Line and route network plans at hvv.de 

Hamburg S-Bahn stations in Schleswig-Holstein
Buildings and structures in Stormarn (district)
Railway stations in Germany opened in 1846